Polyanskoye is a rural locality and the administrative center of Polyansky Selsoviet Rural Settlement, Kursky District, Kursk Oblast, Russia. Population:

Geography 
The village is located on the Bolshaya Kuritsa River (a right tributary of the Seym River), 82 km from the Russia–Ukraine border, 14 km west of Kursk.

 Climate
Polyanskoye has a warm-summer humid continental climate (Dfb in the Köppen climate classification).

Transport 
Polyanskoye is located 7 km from the federal route  Crimea Highway (a part of the European route ), on the road of intermunicipal significance  (M2 "Crimea Highway" – Polyanskoye – border of the Oktyabrsky District), 11 km from the nearest railway station Dyakonovo (railway line Lgov I — Kursk).

The rural locality is situated 21 km from Kursk Vostochny Airport, 129 km from Belgorod International Airport and 224 km from Voronezh Peter the Great Airport.

References

Notes

Sources

Rural localities in Kursky District, Kursk Oblast